The  is a class of destroyers, serving with the Japan Maritime Self-Defense Force (JMSDF). This is the first class of the second-generation general-purpose destroyers of the JMSDF.

Background
Since FY1977, the JMSDF started construction of  under the eight ships / eight helicopters concept. In this concept, each flotillas would be composed of one helicopter destroyer (DDH), five general-purpose destroyers (DD), and two guided-missile destroyers (DDG). By FY1986, construction of twenty first-generation DDs (twelve  and eight ) required for all four flotillas had been completed.

In the original plan, it was supposed to shift to destroyer escorts for local District Forces afterwards. However, if the use of these first-generation DDs was continued to the full extent of ships' life, the relative performance obsolescence was concerned. Thus the JMSDF decided to advance the construction of the new generation DDs. And this was the first class of the second-generation DDs.

Except for Kirisame, all ships of the class are named after Imperial Japanese Navy destroyers sunk in World War II.

Design
The hull design was completely renovated from first-generation DDs. In addition to increasing the size in order to reduce the underwater radiation noise, both superstructure and hull were inclined to reduce the radar cross-section. There is however no angled tripod mainmast like the one of the American  because of the heavy weather of the Sea of Japan in winter.

The engine arrangement is COGAG as same as Asagiri class, but a pair of engines are updated to Spey SM1C. And the remaining one pair are replaced by LM2500, same as Kongō class.

Equipment
The basic configuration of the equipment is the same as first-generation DDs, but they are updated and enhanced throughout. Concepts of its combat system were partly based on those of Kongō class. Two large-screen displays and OJ-663 consoles are introduced in its OYQ-9 combat direction system as Aegis Weapon System (AWS). And OYQ-103 ASW combat systems, based on OYQ-102 of Kongō class and indirectly AN/SQQ-89, present an integrated picture of the tactical situation by receiving, combining, and processing active and passive sensor data from the hull-mounted array, towed array and sonobuoys.

The advanced OPS-24 active electronically scanned array radar and OPS-28 surface search and target acquisition radar introduced into the fleet with the latter batch of the  remain on board, and there are some new systems like the NOLQ-3 electronic warfare suite and OQS-5 bow-mounted sonar.

To enhance the low-observability and combat readiness capability, vertical launching systems were adopted on its missile systems: Mk 41 for VL-ASROC and Mk 48 for Sea Sparrow replace the traditional swivel octuple launchers. And the surface-to-surface missile system is alternated by the SSM-1B of Japanese make. Currently, ships of this class have been switching the point defense missile system from the traditional Sea Sparrow (RIM-7M) to the Evolved Sea Sparrow by FY2012.

The aircraft facility is expanded to accommodate two shipboard helicopters. One Mitsubishi SH-60J/K is a basic load, and another can be accommodated in case of overseas operation.

Ships in the class

Gallery

See also
 List of naval ship classes in service

Notes

References

Books

Articles

External links
 
 GlobalSecurity.org; JMSDF DD Murasame Class

Destroyer classes